B21 may refer to:

Transportation
 B21 (New York City bus), serving Brooklyn, New York City
 BSA B21 (1937–1939), a British motorcycle made by Birmingham Small Arms Company, Birmingham, England
 Kepong–Selayang Highway (Selangor state route B21), Malaysia
 Leyland B21 (1979–1985), a bus chassis manufactured by Leyland
 Volvo Redblock Engine, an automotive engine
 A sports car built by Chevron Cars Ltd

Other uses
 B21 (band), a British bhangra group
 B-21 (machine), a cypher machine invented by Boris Hagelin
 HLA-B21, an HLA - B serotype
 Northrop Grumman B-21 Raider, an American stealth bomber
 Boron-21 (B-21 or 21B), an isotope of boron

See also
 Must B 21, a 2003 album by American singer will.i.am
 North American XB-21, an experimental bomber aircraft developed in the late 1930s
 21B (disambiguation)